Ectemnius rufipes is a species of square-headed wasp in the family Crabronidae. It is found in North America.

Subspecies
These two subspecies belong to the species Ectemnius rufipes:
 Ectemnius rufipes ais Pate, 1946
 Ectemnius rufipes rufipes (Lepeletier de Saint Fargeau & Brullé, 1835)

References

Crabronidae
Articles created by Qbugbot
Insects described in 1835